Henrique George Mautner (born January 17, 1941), better known by his stage name Jorge Mautner, is a Brazilian singer-songwriter, lyricist, violinist, actor, screenwriter, film director and poet, considered to be a pioneer of the MPB scene and of the Tropicalista movement.

Biography

Mautner was born in Rio de Janeiro on January 17, 1941, one month after his mother, Anna Illich, a Catholic Yugoslav, and his father, Paul Mautner, an Austrian Jew, emigrated from Europe to Brazil to escape from the Holocaust. Despite being a sympathizer of Getúlio Vargas, Paul was a part of the Jewish underground resistance. Anna eventually suffered from a major paralysis due to a trauma caused by the fact that Jorge's sister, Susana, was not able to embark to Brazil with them, and so until he was 7 years old a nanny, Lúcia, took care of him; Lúcia was a mãe-de-santo, and introduced Jorge to Candomblé.

In 1948 Jorge's parents divorced, and Anna eventually remarried Henri Müller, a violinist who played for the São Paulo State Symphony, and who taught Jorge how to play the violin. His family later moved to São Paulo, where he studied at the prestigious Colégio Dante Alighieri; despite being an excellent student, he would, however, be expelled before he could graduate from high school because of a text he wrote, considered "indecent" by his teachers.

Mautner began to write his first book, Deus da Chuva e da Morte, when he was 15 years old; it was published in 1962, and in the following year it won the Prêmio Jabuti. Deus da Chuva e da Morte would be the first part of what is today known as his Mitologia do Kaos trilogy, which also comprises Kaos (1963) and Narciso em Tarde Cinza (1965). In it, Mautner would define the main ideology of what he calls the "Kaos Movement".

In 1962 he joined the Brazilian Communist Party, after being invited by Mário Schenberg.

Mautner was arrested during the 1964 Brazilian coup d'état, but was later released, under the conditions of "expressing himself more carefully". In 1966 he recorded his first musical release, the 7" single "Radioatividade", through RCA Records. Soon after he travelled to the United States, where he worked for the UNESCO and as a translator of Brazilian books. He later met poet Robert Lowell, serving as his secretary, as well as Paul Goodman, with whom he developed a strong friendship and suffered an everlasting influence from him.

In 1968 he briefly returned to Brazil, where he worked as screenwriter on Neville d'Almeida's film Jardim de Guerra, that was only released two years later.

In 1970 he travelled to London, where he befriended Gilberto Gil and Caetano Veloso. He later returned to Brazil, settling in Rio de Janeiro once more, where he began to write for the humoristic newspaper O Pasquim. In the same year he directed the film O Demiurgo, which starred himself, Gil, Veloso, José Roberto Aguilar, Péricles Cavalcanti and Leilah Assunção. The film was censored by the dictatorship though, and never received a wide release. (In 2013 Mautner made the film available in its entirety through his official YouTube channel.) Around the same time he met Nélson Jacobina, one of his most prolific songwriting partners, with whom he wrote, among many other songs, the 1974 hit "Maracatu Atômico".

On December 10, 1973, Mautner was invited to partake in the Banquete dos Mendigos "show-manifesto", idealized and directed by Jards Macalé. The show, that happened at the Museum of Modern Art of Rio de Janeiro and was backed by the UN, celebrated the 25th anniversary of the Universal Declaration of Human Rights, and also counted with the presence of Chico Buarque, Dominguinhos, Edu Lobo, Gal Costa, Gonzaguinha, Johnny Alf, Luiz Melodia, Milton Nascimento, MPB4, Nélson Jacobina, Paulinho da Viola and Raul Seixas, among others. It spawned a double-disc live album, which due to censorship issues was only released in 1979.

In 1988 Mautner took part in a short-lived "joke side project" formed by then-Titãs member Arnaldo Antunes named Vestidos de Espaço, which also comprised Branco Mello, Charles Gavin, Paula Toller of Kid Abelha and record producer Liminha. The band's only release before their demise in the following year was a 7" single with the tracks "Pipi Popô" and "A Marcha do Demo"; the latter was included in the Titãs compilation album E-collection from 2000.<ref>books.google.com.br/ "BRock" – By Arthur Dapieve</ref>

In 2002 Mautner served as a guest musician on synth-pop band Metrô's third album, Déjà-Vu, providing violin and additional vocals for a track. In the same year he released a collaborative album with Caetano Veloso, Eu Não Peço Desculpa, which won the Latin Grammy Award in 2003.

A documentary about Mautner, directed by Pedro Bial and Heitor d'Alincourt, was released in 2012 to positive reception, entitled Jorge Mautner: O Filho do Holocausto; it was inspired by his autobiography of the same name, published in 2006. In the same year he collaborated with Rogério Skylab in his album Abismo e Carnaval, writing the lyrics and providing additional vocals for the track "Palmeira Brasileira".

On January 17, 2016, coinciding with his 75th birthday, Mautner published his eleventh book, Kaos Total.

On July 28, 2016, it was reported that Mautner suffered a heart attack and was rushed to the Hospital Samaritano in Rio. He underwent a surgery to implant four stents into his heart, but eventually recovered. One month later, on August 30, he announced that he began work on a 10-volume series of books about his years as a militant for the Brazilian Communist Party during the mid-1960s.

In 2017 Mautner appeared in Laís Bodanzky's film Just Like Our Parents as Homero Fabri.

In April 2019 he released his first studio album in 12 years, entitled Não Há Abismo em que o Brasil Caiba. One of the album's tracks is a tribute to feminist/LGBT activist Marielle Franco, murdered in 2018. The album was considered one of the 25 best Brazilian albums of the first half of 2019 by the São Paulo Association of Art Critics.

Personal life
In 1968 he married historian Ruth Mendes, with whom he had a daughter, Amora (born 1975), who became a famous telenovela director.

Discography
Studio albums

Compilations

Live albums

Singles

As a session member
Metrô
 2002: Déjà-Vu (violin; additional vocals in "Leva Meu Samba")

Rogério Skylab
 2012: Abismo e Carnaval (lyrics and additional vocals in "Palmeira Brasileira")

Bibliography
 1962: Deus da Chuva e da Morte: Mitologia do Kaos, Vol. I (Editora Martins; re-issued in 2002 by Azougue Editorial)
 1963: Kaos: Mitologia do Kaos, Vol. II (Editora Martins; re-issued in 2002 by Azougue Editorial)
 1965: Narciso em Tarde Cinza: Mitologia do Kaos, Vol. III (Editora Exposição do Livro; re-issued in 2002 by Azougue Editorial)
 1965: Vigarista Jorge (Von Schmidt Editora; re-issued in 2002 by Azougue Editorial)
 1973: Fragmentos de Sabonete (Editora Relume-Dumará; re-issued in 2002 by Azougue Editorial)
 1978: Panfletos da Nova Era (Editora Global; re-issued in 2002 by Azougue Editorial)
 1985: Fundamentos do Kaos (Ched Editorial; re-issued in 2002 by Azougue Editorial)
 1993: Miséria Dourada (Editora Maltese; re-issued in 2002 by Azougue Editorial)
 2002: Floresta Verde-Esmeralda (Azougue Editorial)
 2006: O Filho do Holocausto (Editora Agir)
 2016: Kaos Total (Companhia das Letras)

Books about author
 2004: MORAIS JUNIOR, Luís Carlos de. Proteu ou: A Arte das Transmutações. Leituras, audições e visões da obra de Jorge Mautner (Editora HP Comunicação; re-issued in 2011 by Editora Litteris)
 2004: Jorge Mautner em movimento'' (Edited by César Resac)

References

External links
 Jorge Mautner on Facebook
 

1941 births
Living people
Brazilian Jews
Brazilian communists
Brazilian violinists
Brazilian people of Austrian-Jewish descent
Brazilian people of Yugoslav descent
Brazilian screenwriters
Brazilian male poets
Brazilian translators
Brazilian autobiographers
Portuguese–English translators
Brazilian male film actors
Brazilian film directors
Portuguese-language film directors
20th-century Brazilian male actors
21st-century Brazilian male actors
Jewish musicians
Jewish Austrian writers
Latin Grammy Award winners
Música Popular Brasileira singers
Musicians from Rio de Janeiro (city)
20th-century violinists
21st-century violinists
20th-century Brazilian male writers
20th-century Brazilian poets
21st-century Brazilian male writers
21st-century Brazilian poets
Brazilian male singer-songwriters
20th-century Brazilian male singers
20th-century Brazilian singers
21st-century Brazilian male singers
21st-century Brazilian singers